Tian Jun (born 1 January 1982 in Zhongxiang, Jingmen, Hubei) is a male Chinese rower, who competed for Team China at the 2008 Summer Olympics.

Major performances
2006 World Championships – 1st lightweight fours;
2007 World Cup Leg 1/2 – 1st lightweight fours;
2007 World Championships – 5th lightweight fours;
2008 World Cup Leg 1 – 1st lightweight fours

References

1982 births
Living people
Olympic rowers of China
People from Jingmen
Rowers at the 2008 Summer Olympics
Rowers from Hubei
Chinese male rowers
World Rowing Championships medalists for China